Mangwon station is a railway station on Line 6 of the Seoul Subway in Mapo-gu, Seoul.

Station layout

Exits
 Exit 1 : Seongseo Elementary School
 Exit 2 : Seongsan Elementary School, Donggyo Elementary School

References 

Metro stations in Mapo District
Seoul Metropolitan Subway stations
Railway stations opened in 2000